Jonathan Rashleigh Knight-Rodriguez (born November 29, 1968) is an American singer. He is best known for being a member of the boy band New Kids on the Block, along with his younger brother Jordan, Donnie Wahlberg, Joey McIntyre, and Danny Wood. He is the oldest member of the band and the first to leave it in 1994 prior to their official split.

Early life
Jonathan Knight was born in Boston, Massachusetts, to Canadian parents. (His father, an  Episcopal priest, is from Meaford, Ontario; his mother is from Dunnville, Ontario.) He is one of six children: Allison, Sharon, David, Christopher and Jordan.

New Kids on the Block

From 1986 until 1994, Knight was a member of the American boy band New Kids on the Block (NKOTB). They went on to sell over 80 million records worldwide before splitting in 1994 after he left during the tour for their 1994 album Face the Music. The group attempted to continue the tour claiming Jonathan had been badly hurt by a horse, but in a press conference a few weeks later, they revealed that they were actually splitting.

In the spring of 2008, Knight returned to show business, reuniting with the other four members of New Kids on the Block. They released their seventh album (and first in 14 years), The Block, on September 2, 2008. To confirm their reunion and announce the new album, they performed live together on May 16, 2008 for the first time in fifteen years on the Today show.

A world tour was scheduled to follow the new release and began in Toronto on September 18, 2008. The first single from it, "Summertime", performed well worldwide peaking at #9 in Canada and breaking the top 30 in the U.S. charts (#24 as a digital download). They released "Single", their second single from The Block in August 2008.

Personal life
Jonathan is the older brother of band mate Jordan Knight.

In the years after the group first disbanded, Knight worked as a real estate investor living in Essex, Massachusetts; no longer in the spotlight, he rarely made public appearances or gave interviews. In 2000, he revealed that he suffered from generalized anxiety disorder since his early career with New Kids on the Block. He has since sought medical help and his health has improved. In 2011, he appeared on MTV reality series True Life to help a fan suffering from panic disorder.

In 2009, the National Enquirer published an article from his ex-boyfriend Kyle Wilker, who outed him as gay without his consent. Jonathan Knight said, "I have lived my life very openly and have never hidden the fact that I am gay." In a statement on the New Kids on the Block blog, he added, "Apparently the prerequisite to being a gay public figure is to appear on the cover of a magazine with the caption 'I am gay'. I apologize for not doing so if this is what was expected!"

Since 2008, Knight has been in a relationship with Harley Rodriguez. The two participated in the 26th season of the reality competition series The Amazing Race, which aired on CBS in early 2015, where they placed 9th. On November 15, 2016, while vacationing in Africa, the two became engaged when Knight proposed to Rodriguez. 
In March 2021, Knight began hosting the HGTV television show Farmhouse Fixer, in which he restores old New England farmhouses for clients.

On August 25, 2022, it was revealed that Knight and Rodriguez had married.

Discography

New Kids on the Block albums
 New Kids on the Block (1986)
 Hangin' Tough (1988)
 Step by Step (1990)
 Face the Music (1994)
 The Block (2008)
 10 (2013)
 Thankful (2017)

References

External links
New Kids On The Block official website
New Kids On The Block videos

1968 births
Living people
20th-century American singers
20th-century American LGBT people
21st-century American singers
21st-century LGBT people
American gay musicians
American male dancers
American male pop singers
American male singers
American people of Canadian descent
American real estate brokers
American television hosts
Columbia Records artists
Interscope Records artists
LGBT people from Massachusetts
American LGBT singers
Musicians from Boston
Musicians from Worcester, Massachusetts
New Kids on the Block members
NKOTBSB members
People from Dorchester, Massachusetts
Singers from Massachusetts
The Amazing Race (American TV series) contestants